Snaresbrook is a London Underground station on the Central line, located in the area of Snaresbrook in East London.  The station is in Zone 3/4, between Leytonstone and South Woodford stations.

History
The station was opened by the Eastern Counties Railway on 22 August 1856 as part of their branch to Loughton which opened that day. Originally named Snaresbrook, the station was renamed several times: Snaresbrook for Wanstead in 1857; Snaresbrook and Wanstead in November 1898; Snaresbrook for Wanstead in 1929; and Snaresbrook on 14 December 1947. The station formed part of the Great Eastern Railway's system until that company amalgamated with other railways to create the London & North Eastern Railway (LNER) in 1923. The station was subsequently transferred to form part of London Underground's Central line from 14 December 1947. This formed a part of the long planned, and delayed, Eastern Extension of the Central line that was part of the London Passenger Transport Board's "New Works Programme" of 1935–1940.

The station was partially reconstructed in 1893, the most notable feature being the provision of a bay platform that remained in use until transfer to the Underground.

The station is a fine survivor of a Victorian suburban station, with later additions, and includes a brick built station building as well as extensive cast iron and timber canopies to the platforms. A small secondary ticket office, serving the westbound platforms, was constructed in c.1948 but this is now unused. Also of note, dating from the same date, are the examples of the concrete roundels (some combined with lamp posts) found on the platforms.

In 2018, it was announced that the station would gain step-free access by 2023–24, as part of a £200m investment to increase the number of accessible stations on the Tube.

The station today
In addition to the main building, an alternative exit open at morning peak hours is available directly on the south side of Wanstead High Street, with another open all day on the north side of the same road accessible via footbridge running parallel to the railway.

Connections
London Buses route W14 serves the station.

Gallery

References

London Underground Stations; David Leboff; Ian Allan; London; 1994

Tube stations in the London Borough of Redbridge
Former Great Eastern Railway stations
Railway stations in Great Britain opened in 1856
Central line (London Underground) stations
London Underground Night Tube stations
Proposed Chelsea-Hackney Line stations